James Rood Doolittle (January 3, 1815July 27, 1897) was an American politician who served as a U.S. Senator from Wisconsin from March 4, 1857, to March 4, 1869. He was a strong supporter of President Abraham Lincoln's administration during the American Civil War.

Early life
Born in Hampton, New York, Doolittle was the son of Reuben Doolittle and Sarah Rood. He attended Middlebury Academy in Wyoming, New York, and, in 1834, he graduated from Hobart College in Geneva, New York. He subsequently studied law and was admitted to the New York bar association in 1837.

Early career
He then established a law practice in Rochester. Doolittle moved to Warsaw, New York, in 1841. From 1847 to 1850, he was the district attorney for Wyoming County. He also served for a time as a colonel in the New York State militia.

In 1851, Doolittle moved to Racine, Wisconsin, and, in 1853, was elected Wisconsin Circuit Court Judge for the 1st Circuit, defeating incumbent appointee Wyman Spooner.  During his time as judge, he presided over the July 1855 case of The State of Wisconsin v. David F. Mayberry, the result of which led to the only recorded lynching in the history of Rock County, Wisconsin.  Doolittle resigned from the court in March 1856.

Senator
Until the 1850 repeal of the Missouri Compromise, Doolittle was a Democrat. He left the party and was elected and then re-elected to the Senate as a Republican in 1857 and 1863, respectively. He was a delegate to the Peace Conference of 1861 in Washington, DC.

While senator, Doolittle was the Chairman of the Committee on Indian Affairs. Along with his colleague, Jacob Collamer of Vermont, Doolittle represented the minority view for the Mason Report (June 1860), which was prepared by the Senate committee to investigate John Brown's raid on Harper's Ferry in October 1859. He also proposed a constitutional amendment to ban secession.

During the Civil War, Doolittle supported many of Lincoln's policies, and he was active in representing Wisconsin's interests on Capitol Hill. During the summer recess of 1865, he visited the Natives west of the Mississippi River as chairman of the Joint Special Committee on Conditions of Indian Tribes, which was charged with an inquiry into the condition of the Native tribes and their treatment by the US civil and military authorities. In the West, the committee split into subcommittees, which considered different regions with Doolittle participating in the inquiry into Native affairs in Kansas, the Indian Territory, and Colorado.

The report of the committee, The Condition of the Tribes, was issued on January 26, 1867. Doolittle was accused by The New York Times in 1872, while he was under consideration for appointment as Secretary of the Interior in the projected "reform cabinet" by Democratic presidential candidate Horace Greeley, of suppressing the report, as it contained information exposing the Native ring of fraudulent suppliers of goods to the Native tribes under treaty obligations. The Times alleged that the report was printed only after the Cincinnati Gazette obtained a copy of it.

Doolittle took a prominent part in the debate on the various war and reconstruction measures, upholding the federal government but always insisting that the seceding states had never ceased to be a part of the Union. He strongly opposed the Fifteenth Amendment and believed that each state should determine questions of suffrage for itself.

Later life
After he left Congress, he ran for Governor of Wisconsin in 1871 as a Democrat. After he lost, he retired from politics.

Doolittle returned to the Midwest and became a lawyer in Chicago, Illinois while he maintained his residence in Racine. He served for a year as the acting president of the Old University of Chicago, and he spent many years on its staff as a professor in the law school as well as serving on the Board of Trustees.

He was president of the National Union Convention of 1866 in Philadelphia and also of the 1872 Democratic National Convention in Baltimore, which adopted the nomination of Horace Greeley. He died of Bright's disease in Edgewood, Rhode Island in 1897, and was interred in Mound Cemetery in Racine, Wisconsin.

References

Sources

 Retrieved on 2009-04-28

1815 births
1897 deaths
People from Hampton, New York
Doolittle family
Wisconsin Democrats
Republican Party United States senators from Wisconsin
Candidates in the 1868 United States presidential election
Wisconsin state court judges
Politicians from Racine, Wisconsin
People from Warsaw, New York
Politicians from Chicago
New York (state) lawyers
Illinois lawyers
Wisconsin lawyers
People of Wisconsin in the American Civil War
19th-century American judges
19th-century American lawyers
Wisconsin Republicans